Aminabad or Aminabad Noon is a village of Bhalwal Tehsil in Sargodha District, Punjab, Pakistan. It is located at an altitude of 166 metres (547 feet).

References

Populated places in Sargodha District